Michael Nevin may refer to:
 Michael Nevin (boxer) (born 1998), Irish boxer
 Michael Nevin (diplomat), British diplomat
 Mike Nevin (1943–2012), American politician